Simul climbing, also known as climbing with a running belay, is a climbing method or style where all the climbers climb at the same time while tied into the same rope. Protection is placed by the first member of the rope team and the last member removes the pieces of gear. In most cases, the climbing team maintains multiple pieces of protection between them to prevent a system failure if one of the pieces was to fail. Usually, a belay device is not used. However, the first climber may be belayed by the second until enough rope is out for the leader to avoid a ground fall. Similarly, the leader may use a belay device as the second approaches a belay station to avoid the potential for a large fall.

Fall potential
The roles of the leader and second in simul climbing are very different than they are in free climbing.  If the leader falls during free climbing, the second (follower) is pulled up from their belay station.  In simul climbing, if the leader falls, the second is pulled up from wherever they are climbing. The hazards of a fall for the second climber relative to the lead climber are more similar than they are when they are free climbing.

Nonetheless, the hazards during a fall are significantly different for simul climbing when compared to free climbing. For example, in simul climbing, the leader can be pulled off the rock when the second climber falls unexpectedly. If both climbers are climbing on or above an overhang and either falls, they may both fall away from the rock and be left hanging by their rope beneath the overhang. This would require them to climb the rope, or swing themselves, or adjust their weight difference significantly so that one of them can reach the rock again.

In free climbing, the second climber traditionally belays from a stationary belay position and is not in a position to fall.  In simul climbing the second is actively climbing and can sustain a fall.  If the second falls while simul climbing the leader catches the fall with their own body.  This jolt has a high likelihood of pulling the leader off the rock towards their last piece of gear.  This sort of fall has the potential to be devastating for the leader.  To avoid this possibility it is traditional to put the better climbers second so that they will not fall.

Variations
Simul climbing or variations of simul climbing are commonly used while speed climbing.

References

See also
Climbing styles
Rock climbing

Climbing techniques